Hațieganu is a Romanian surname. Notable people with the surname include:

Emil Hațieganu (1878–1959), Romanian politician and jurist
Iuliu Hațieganu, brother of Emil
Iuliu Hațieganu University of Medicine and Pharmacy

Romanian-language surnames